The 3rd British Academy Film Awards, known retroactively as the British Academy Film Awards, were given by the British Academy of Film and Television Arts (BAFTA) (known then as the British Film Academy) on 29 May 1950, and honoured the best films of 1948 and 1949. The awards for Best British Film and Best Film from any Source was handed out to The Third Man and Bicycle Thieves, respectively, and The Third Man was the most nominated feature film, with two.

Winners and nominees
The Third Man and Bicycle Thieves received the awards for Best British Film and Best Film from any Source, respectively, and The Third Man received a further nomination in the latter category; Daybreak in Udi received the award for Best Documentary; French education film, La Famille Martin received the Special Award; and The Search received the United Nations Award.

Winners are listed first and highlighted in boldface; the nominees are listed below alphabetically and not in boldface.

See also
 7th Golden Globe Awards
 22nd Academy Awards

References

External links
The British Academy of Film and Television Arts Official website

Film003
1949 film awards
1950 in British cinema
May 1950 events in the United Kingdom
1950 in London